The Washington and Old Dominion Railroad Regional Park is a linear regional park in Northern Virginia.  The park's primary feature is the Washington and Old Dominion Railroad Trail (abbreviated as W&OD Trail), an asphalt-surfaced paved rail trail that runs through densely populated urban and suburban communities as well as through rural areas. Most of the trail travels on top of the rail bed of the former Washington and Old Dominion Railroad, which closed in 1968.

A crushed bluestone–surfaced bridle path travels near the paved trail in the park's most westerly . The path is suitable for horseback riding and mountain biking.

NOVA Parks (formerly named the Northern Virginia Regional Park Authority (NVRPA)) administers and maintains the park and its trails. NOVA Parks keeps most of the parkland surrounding the trails in a natural state.  The park authority has placed alongside the paved trail a series of mile markers and a number of interpretative exhibits that describe the historic and natural features of the park (see Washington and Old Dominion Railroad Stations for locations of historical markers near the W&OD Trail).

The headquarters office of the park is near the southwest side of the trail at Smith's Switch Road in Ashburn.  A park rest stop is adjacent to the trail near the park's headquarters.

Route

The W&OD Trail begins in the Nauck neighborhood near the Shirlington section of Arlington County, close to the boundary between the County and the City of Alexandria. The trail ends in Purcellville in western Loudoun County. Its route largely parallels the routes of the Potomac River and Virginia State Route 7 (VA 7).

The trail connects at its origin to the paved Four Mile Run Trail, which travels eastward through Arlington along a stream embankment to meet the Mount Vernon Trail at Ronald Reagan Washington National Airport, near the Potomac River. The start of the trail is also accessible from the Shirlington exit (Exit 6) of Interstate 395 (I-395) (the Henry G. Shirley Memorial Highway).
The trail parallels the more curving and hilly Four Mile Run Trail throughout its route in Arlington. Although they coincide in several locations, the two trails generally travel on opposite sides of the Run.  There are no restrooms and few water fountains alongside the W&OD Trail in the County. Restrooms and additional water fountains are available near ball fields and picnic areas along the Four Mile Run Trail.

The W&OD Trail's trailhead (Mile 0) is at the intersection of South Shirlington Road and South Four Mile Run Drive.

The trail climbs  in  while traveling northwest through Arlington County. While in Arlington, the trail ascends through the Atlantic Seaboard fall line while climbing upstream in the valley of Four Mile Run. The trail crosses the Run seven times in the valley on bridges whose abutments were constructed before the Civil War by the Alexandria, Loudoun & Hampshire Railroad, a predecessor of the W&OD Railroad.

After crossing Columbia Pike (VA 244), the trail enters a steeply-sloped woodland that covers both sides of the valley. The trail crosses under Arlington Boulevard (U.S. Route 50) while within the woodland. 

After crossing its intersection with the Custis Trail, the W&OD Trail travels northwest near an I-66 soundwall for most of its remaining course in Arlington. After crossing under North Sycamore Street next to Four Mile Run, the W&OD Trail crosses over the Run and passes the East Falls Church station on Washington Metro's Orange and Silver Lines.

After leaving the fall line, the W&OD Trail enters the Piedmont plateau region near the west corner of the County.  The trail continues to climb in the Piedmont while traveling northwest through the City of Falls Church and Fairfax County.

When it reaches this point, the trail has risen  while traveling .

After crossing over I-495 (the Capital Beltway) on a trail bridge and passing Dunn Loring, the trail begins a long descent as it travels through Vienna.

After the trail crosses Difficult Run (Mile 14.3), it ascends and descends between additional streams (including Sugarland Run, Broad Run, Beaverdam Run, Goose Creek, Sycolin Creek and Tuscarora Creek) as it travels further northwest in the Piedmont through or near Reston, Herndon, Sterling, Ashburn, and Leesburg.

The trail then turns west, descends through Paeonian Springs to Hamilton Station and climbs to reach Purcellville.

Trail features

History
Soon after the railroad closed, the Virginia Department of Highways purchased the railroad's property from the line's owner, the Chesapeake and Ohio Railway, with the intent of using a portion of the right-of-way for the construction of I-66. In the same year that the railroad closed, the Virginia Electric and Power Company (VEPCO) (part of which was incorporated into Dominion Virginia Power in 2000) purchased most of the property from the highway department, as the company's electric power transmission lines were travelling within the right-of-way.

Trail construction and extension
The first portion of the W&OD Trail opened in 1974 within the City of Falls Church under a lease agreement between the City government, the power company and the NVRPA. As the  trail proved to be popular, the NVRPA agreed to purchase the right-of-way from the power company on December 19, 1977, and made purchases of it between 1978 and 1982. The power company retained an easement that permitted the company to maintain its lines and to extend them along the right-of-way if needed.

The NVRPA was not able to acquire from the power company the portion of the right-of-way that lay within the City of Alexandria.  The NVRPA also could not acquire the portion of right-of-way that the highway department had retained for construction of I-66 near East Falls Church in Arlington and various portions of the right-of-way that contained existing or potential highway crossings.

The NVRPA extended the trail east and west of Falls Church as it acquired portions of the right-of-way until it stretched from Alexandria to Purcellville. Beyond that it was only suitable for hiking.

In 1981, the NVRPA paved the trail from Vienna to Herndon.

The trail's route west of Leesburg remained accessible only by foot.  

Also in 1982, the trail was extended and paved eastward from Falls Church to Patrick Henry Drive in Arlington as part of the construction of I-66. During that same time period, the NVRPA began paving the easternmost section of trail from Shirlington Road to Columbia Pike (VA 244) in Arlington, with that work completed by the end of 1983.

In September 1984, the NVRPA finished paving two sections of the trail, an extension westward from Herndon to Sterling and, two weeks later, an extension east from I-66 to Columbia Pike. Prior to the 1984 completion, the Arlington section of the trail from Columbia Pike to Lee Highway had been a dirt and gravel path. A sewer construction project that traveled along Four Mile Run delayed the paving for years. 

In 1985, the NVRPA extended the paved portion of the trail through Leesburg, together with a parallel bridle path that NVRPA extended to Purcellville. The paved trail reached its western terminus in Purcellville in 1988.

In 2002, the NVRPA constructed the final section of the trail in and near Arlington County's Bluemont Park. Construction was delayed for years after encountering opposition from the public because of the paved section's potential environmental impacts. When completed, the final section connected the W&OD Trail's intersection with the Bluemont Junction Trail to the section of the W&OD Trail that is just east of North Carlin Springs Road. The final section included a new trail bridge over Four Mile Run and an underpass below North Carlin Springs Road.

On October 20, 2007, construction began for a paved trail that would connect the W&OD Trail at its origin with the Four Mile Run Trail by traveling for  along a bank of the Run while passing beneath the Henry G. Shirley Memorial Highway (I-395) in Alexandria and West Glebe Road in Arlington. On May 30, 2009, a ribbon-cutting ceremony heralded the completion and opening of the connecting trail.

Spot changes
After constructing most of the trail, the NVRPA focused on grade-separating the trail and making other spot changes, sometimes in collaboration with the Virginia Department of Transportation (VDOT) or with developers of nearby properties. In 1989, the VDOT completed the Herndon Parkway on the east side of Herndon, which included a trail bridge over the Parkway. In 1990, a trail bridge was constructed over VA 28 in eastern Loudoun County as part of a project to widen that road. 

In 1991, the trail crossing of Reston Parkway (VA 602) in Reston was moved from Sunset Hills Road (VA 675) to Bluemont Way. On October 3, 1993, the NVRPA completed a bridge over West Broad Street (VA 7) in Falls Church.

The  of old trail in that section became connectors to the parkway at Bluemont Way. The western section of the Herndon Parkway, with another trail bridge over it, was completed in 1997. In 2001, the VDOT expanded the Fairfax County Parkway (VA 286) across the W&OD Trail right-of-way, building an overpass for the trail at about the same time.

In 2005, the Sugarland Run Valley Stream Trail in Herndon was extended  to connect to the trail. In May 2006, the VDOT completed work on an extension of Claiborne Parkway (VA 901) that crossed NOVA Parks' right-of-way. As part of the project, the VDOT constructed a bridge that carried the W&OD Trail over the extended Parkway. 

On June 15, 2011, VDOT opened a new trail bridge over I-495 that was constructed as part of the Capital Beltway High Occupancy Toll (HOT) Lanes project. The new bridge was both  wider and  higher than the one built in 1979. In 2013-2015, an Arlington County streetscape and utilities project realigned the W&OD's Trail's crossing of Columbia Pike (VA 244). An associated Arlington County project constructed a plaza and a bicycle "learner's loop" adjacent to the realigned trail in the County's Glencarlyn Park.

In late 2015, a truck-climbing lane project was completed on VA 7 in Clarke's Gap. The project realigned the trail to move its crossing of Charles Town Pike (VA 9) at Dry Mill Road (VA 699) to a new underpass beneath the Pike on the south side of VA 7.

In 2017, a bridge carrying Belmont Ridge Road (VA 659) over the W&OD Trail and a trail parking lot was constructed in Loudoun County as part of a project to widen the road. Also in 2017, NOVA Parks made within the County a set of safety improvements at the trail's crossing of S. Sterling Boulevard (VA 846), including removing one left turn lane to reduce the trail's crossing distance, installing Rectangular Rapid Flashing Beacons, and widening the Boulevard's median 

On March 12, 2021, the VDOT opened a W&OD Trail pedestrian and bicycle bridge over Lee Highway  (U.S. 29) in Arlington County's East Falls Church neighborhood as part of its "Transform 66 - Inside the Beltway" I-66 eastbound widening project. When planning the project, the VDOT hosted several public meetings that provided information about the bridge, which had raised concerns among neighborhood residents.

W&OD Dual Trails project
Around 2017, NOVA Parks commissioned a feasibility study for a potential widening of the W&OD Trail or for adding a parallel trail to it within Falls Church and Arlington County because of high use at peak times.

The two imperviously-surfaced trails traveled through a  urban open space that a 2016 Falls Church master plan had called "The City's Greenest Street". The master plan's "Vision Statement" stated that the project would help "Develop the W&OD Park as a Great Street and greenway". 

Officials broke ground on the Falls Church "W&OD Dual Trails" project on August 26, 2020. The widened trail formally opened during a ribbon-cutting ceremony on October 7, 2021. The executive director of NOVA Parks, Paul Gilbert, stated during the event: "I envision over the next decade, more and more urban sections of the W&OD Trail will take on this dual trail methodology."

Designations
In 1987, the U. S. Department of the Interior designated the trail as a National Recreation Trail. In 1999, Virginia Department of Historic Resources staff determined that the "Washington and Old Dominion Railroad Historic District" (053-0276) was eligible for listing on the National Register of Historic Places (NRHP). A 2000 NRHP registration form states that the Historic District is eligible for the listing because the District "is associated with events that have made a significant contribution to the broad patterns of our history". The form contains an in-depth description of the District's historical resources and of the railroad's history, as well as maps that show the locations of the Districts's major historical features.

Historic structures

The park and its immediate surroundings contain a number of historic structures, some of which date to the pre-Civil War period. Most of these structures are railroad remnants, including intact stations at Vienna, Sunset Hills, Herndon, Hamilton and Purcellville,  stone arches and culverts, the piers and abutments of bridges, and a relocated passenger shelter (formerly at the site of the Clarks Gap station at the present crossing of the trail and Dry Mill Road (VA 699); now at the former site of the Paeonian Springs station near Simpson Circle).

Part of the reinforced concrete floor of a brick electrical substation that the railroad constructed in 1912 to help supply power to its new electric locomotives and trolley cars is visible in Arlington County's Bluemont Junction Railroad Display south of Wilson Boulevard. The floor is located in the space between a soccer field and a Southern Railway caboose.

A remnant of a coal trestle stands south of the W&OD Trail, near the west end of the trail's bridge over Lee Highway (U.S. 29) in Arlington.  In June 2014, the owner of a property adjacent to the regional park demolished part of the structure to provide space for a planned self-storage facility. At the time, the Arlington County government was considering a proposal to designate the structure as a local historic district. In September 2014, the Arlington County Board designated the remaining portion of trestle, which was located on NVRPA property, as a local historic district. The trestle was once adjacent to the west side of the railroad's Falls Church (East Falls Church) station, which was dismantled after the railroad closed.

A white metallic marker post lettered in black with the words "Station 1 Mile" stands on the north side of the trail west of Little Falls Road near the boundary between Arlington and Falls Church. This post, which once stood next to the W&OD Railroad's tracks, is one mile (1.6 km) east of the site of the railroad's demolished West Falls Church Station. The station was located near the east side of the railroad's crossing of W. Broad Street (VA 7) in Falls Church.

Near the east end of Vienna, the poured concrete abutment of a bridge that carried an interurban trolley line, the Arlington & Fairfax Railway, over the W&OD Railroad remains on the north side of the trail. An inscription showing the month and year of the abutment's construction (July 1904) is visible on the structure's east side.

The trail crosses Goose Creek in Loudoun County on a span that NVRPA built on top of the piers and abutments of the highest and longest bridge that the railroad constructed within the present boundaries of the regional park.  Visitors can view these remnants and the intact span, pier and abutments of the railroad's deck girder bridge over Sycolin Creek from unpaved paths that travel between the streams in NVRPA's Two Creeks Trail Area on the north side of the trail.

The Sycolin Creek bridge bears the only remaining span that once carried trains of the W&OD Railroad. As the trail travels on the concrete deck of the bridge, visitors can only see the span and the structures below if they leave the trail.

The piers and abutments of the railroad's bridge over Tuscarora Creek are visible south of the trail near the east end of Leesburg.  The bridge was the second longest that the railroad built within the present boundaries of the regional park. The piers and abutments are the only ones along the trail's route that do not presently support a bridge.

Remnants of the facilities of a 19th-century lime company are visible in Leesburg on the northeast side of the trail, southeast of Harrison Street SE. Limestone (calcium carbonate) from a company quarry was mixed with coal and burned in a nearby kiln that was adjacent to the railroad's tracks. Quicklime (calcium oxide) was brought out of the kiln through two arched openings that visitors can see from the trail. The company also supplied farmers with agricultural lime and provided builders with lime plaster for walls and stone for roads.

Near the saddle point of Clarks Gap, a stone arch crosses over the trail. Constructed around 1867-1868 soon after the end of the Civil War, the masonry arch once carried the original VA 7 over the railroad's tracks at the railroad's highest point. The arch now carries Dry Mill Road (VA 699) over the trail.

Displays and museums
The Norfolk Southern Railway and its predecessors have donated three cabooses for display along the W&OD Trail.  While none of these resemble the cabooses that once travelled along the route of the W&OD Railroad, two of the three cars house exhibits of materials relating to the W&OD Railroad and Trail.

A Southern Railway bay window caboose (number X441) within the Bluemont Junction Railroad Display in Arlington exhibits photographs, maps and other information related to the County's railroads and trolleys. Staffed by a County park ranger, the caboose is open to the public on weekend afternoons from the Memorial Day weekend through Labor Day.

Adjacent to the Trail in Vienna, the Freeman Store houses a museum of the town's history. The museum contains maps, books and other materials that relate to the W&OD Railroad.  Operated by Historic Vienna, Inc., the museum is open to the public during the afternoons of each week from Wednesdays through Sundays.

A cupola caboose near the Trail in Vienna Centennial Park contains a museum that houses materials that the W&OD Railroad once used. Staffed by members of the Optimist Club of Greater Vienna, bearing on its sides the name "WASHINGTON & OLD DOMINION RAILROAD" and numbered 503, the caboose is open to the public during the afternoons on selected weekends and holidays. A metallic white railroad whistle post with black markings is located in Vienna Centennial Park on the north side of the Trail between Church Street NE and the caboose.

The W&OD Railroad station in Vienna houses a museum and a model railroad layout.  Operated by the Northern Virginia Model Railroaders, Inc., the museum displays materials that the W&OD Railroad once used and a model of the station as it appeared when steam locomotives stopped at the station.  The model railroad and museum is open to the public during the afternoon of one Saturday of each month except June and August.

The W&OD Railroad station in Herndon houses the Herndon Depot Museum, which the Herndon Historical Society operates.  The museum, which is open on Sundays from noon to 3:00 p.m. from March to mid-December, displays photographs and newspaper articles relating to the history of the Town of Herndon and the W&OD Railroad.

The museum also contains materials that the railroad once used. The museum additionally contains information about the history of a nearby Norfolk and Western Railway cupola caboose whose sides bore the name and logo of the W&OD Railroad and the number 504 in 2006. A railroad whistle post is located near the caboose

An overlook at the Luck Stone Quarry east of Goose Creek displays a large trap rock quarry. This mineral provides bulk for concrete, macadam and paving stones.

The W&OD Railroad station in Purcellville houses the Loudoun Visitors Center.  The Visitors Center contains a W&OD Railroad historical display and hosts wine-tasting events.  The Visitors Center is open from noon to 4:00 p.m. on Saturdays and Sundays from late April through October.

Natural resources
Most of the landscaping in the park is left in a natural state to preserve green space and to provide wildlife habitat. Some natural areas within the park are contiguous to larger natural areas in adjacent public parks, including those in and around the Sparrow Pond wetland, Brandymore Castle and Four Mile Run in Arlington, Piney Branch and Difficult Run in Fairfax County, and the confluence of Goose Creek and Sycolin Creek in Loudoun County.

Park interpreters, local teachers, environmental groups and amateur naturalists use the park as a resource for plant and animal study.  These groups have identified approximately 450 species of wildflowers and more than 100 species of birds in the park.  Wildlife in the park includes mammals such as foxes, river otters and beavers, and reptiles such as turtles and snakes.  A variety of hawks and owls and other resident, non-resident and migratory birds, both upland and aquatic, find habitat in the park.

Transmission lines

The W&OD Trail lies beneath a set of electric power transmission lines between its trailhead and the Dominion Virginia Power's Pleasant View Substation in Loudoun County southeast of Leesburg.  The power company removes trees along this section of the trail to protect its lines, at times eliciting protests from members of the public and elected officials in the impacted jurisdictions.  Trees shade much of the remainder of the trail.

In 2004, Dominion Virginia Power announced plans to extend its transmission lines in Loudoun County above ground from the Pleasant View Substation northwestward along the route of the W&OD Trail. In response, on November 15, 2005, the Loudoun County Board of Supervisors unanimously adopted a resolution of continued opposition to the installation of the proposed transmission lines along the Trail.

Citing the impending loss of trees along its trail, the NVRPA asked the public on December 13, 2005, to oppose Dominion Virginia Power's application for the transmission line project in hearings that the State Corporation Commission (SCC) was planning to conduct as part of its review of the project.  During 2005, 2006 and 2007, the NVRPA submitted testimony and briefs to the SCC that opposed the construction of transmission lines along the route of the trail.

In January 2007, an SCC hearing examiner recommended the construction of an overhead transmission line that would follow a wooded segment of the W&OD Trail between Leesburg and Clark's Gap.  After the SCC ordered the examiner to consider construction of an underground line along that segment of the trail, the Loudoun County Board of Supervisors unanimously adopted on June 5, 2007, a resolution that supported the location of the line along that segment only if the SCC required Dominion to "install the line underground at a minimum width with the least amount of impact".

The SCC nevertheless approved on February 15, 2008, a transmission line route that would travel above ground for  along the same segment of the trail. The Commission's approval order stated that the SCC had adopted the Examiner's recommendation against underground construction "due to both the physical, and the cost to the ratepayers, of the impacts that would result therefrom."

Less than three weeks later, on March 4 and 5, 2008, the Senate and the House of Delegates of the Virginia General Assembly unanimously passed emergency legislation that ordered the SCC to approve the underground construction of the line along that segment of the trail as part of a statewide pilot program for the development of such types of transmission lines. Sponsored by Delegate Joe T. May (Republican - Loudoun), the legislation exempted the project from any requirements for further SCC analyses relating to the impacts of the route, including environmental impacts and impacts upon historical resources. 

The legislation went into effect when Virginia Governor Tim Kaine approved it on April 2, 2008.  Soon afterwards, the power company asked the SCC to approve construction of the underground transmission line in accordance with the terms of the legislation. The SCC approved construction of the underground line on May 28, 2008.

The NVRPA expected the project to result in a significant loss of trees, as the power company planned to dig trenches on each side of the paved trail while installing duct banks to house its conduits.  Supporting the NVRPA's expectation, Dominion Virginia Power noted that the environmental impacts associated with underground cable installation in suburban and rural areas are significantly greater than are those of overhead line construction. The W&OD Trail closed for a year in the project area while the power company constructed its underground lines.  The trail reopened to the public in November 2010.

Future plans

Arlington County
In July 2020, NOVA Parks received a $650,000 grant from the Northern Virginia Transportation Authority (NVTA) that enabled NOVA Parks to make plans to extend the organization's "Dual Trails" project for  eastward from the City of Falls Church into Arlington County (from North Roosevelt Street to North Carlin Springs Road). Although NOVA Parks had asked NVTA for sufficient funds ($5,646,000) to complete the project, the NVTA awarded only the amount that NOVA Parks had requested for design, engineering and environmental work.

The reduced award followed an NVTA public comment period that attracted more than 300 responders. Most comments supported the expansion, although the majority of comments that NVTA could identify as coming from Arlington opposed it.

Loudoun County
There have been plans to extend the trail west to Bluemont and the Appalachian Trail since the 1980s. Loudoun County's 2003 Bicycle and Pedestrian Mobility Master Plan and Virginia's 2013 and 2018 Outdoors Plans recommend such extensions. 

However, difficulties in identifying a route and acquiring land have prevented construction of a trail along the W&OD Railroad's abandoned right-of-way west of Purcellville. Further, construction has occurred on a portion of the former right-of-way that travels through Round Hill.

For those reasons, the Loudoun County government is no longer considering such a route. Instead, the County is now planning to construct a new trail between Purcellville and Round Hill along VA-7 (Business).

The County has designed and acquired easements for a  shared-use trail that will travel between Main Street (VA 719) in Round Hill and Franklin Park in Purcellville along East Loudoun Street (VA-7 (Business)). In 2019, the County solicited bids to build that section of the trail. Construction started on the project in 2020. The project's planners expected in that year that construction would reach completion during the winter of 2022.  That section of the trail will connect to a trail under design that will travel along West Main Street (VA 7 (Business)) to connect Franklin Park and Purcellville.

See also
Cycling infrastructure
List of rail trails in Virginia

Notes

References
 
In Appendix K of NORTHERN VIRGINIA REGIONAL PARK AUTHORITY - PRE-FILED DIRECT TESTIMONY OF MR. HAFNER, MR. MCRAY AND MR. SIMMONS, November 30, 2005 (Part 5), Case No. PUE-2005-00018, Virginia State Corporation Commission. Obtained in 

In Appendix J of NORTHERN VIRGINIA REGIONAL PARK AUTHORITY - PRE-FILED DIRECT TESTIMONY OF MR. HAFNER, MR. MCRAY AND MR. SIMMONS, November 30, 2005 (Part 4), Case No. PUE-2005-00018, Virginia State Corporation Commission. Obtained in

External links

 
 The Friends of the Washington & Old Dominion Trail official website Retrieved September 27, 2017.
 
 
  Description of W&OD Trail and surrounding areas, published in Spokes, September 2006.
 Paul McCray (former Manager, W&OD Regional Park) discussing history of W&OD Trail in Uenuma, F, "Two Decades Along the W&OD Trail", The Washington Post video in The Washington Post  Retrieved June 20, 2008.
 Ride Bicycle USA (October 13, 2020).  (video - 3:03:13 hours)
  "Washington and Old Dominion Railroad Markers" series in HMdb: The Historical Marker Database. Photographs and descriptions of NVRPA markers and other markers along and near the W&OD Trail.
 Washington and Old Dominion Trail in National Recreation Trails Database in American Trails website

Maps and elevation tables

  Interactive map showing mile markers, points of interest and other features near and along the trail.
 
  Google street map and satellite image of the W&OD Trail showing locations of parking areas and other trail features.
  In 
 Interactive map of entire W&OD Trail and trail segments showing mileages and features along trail.
  Interactive map of entire W&OD Trail and trail segments showing mileages, elevations and features along trail.
  Graphical representation of elevations at mileposts on the W&OD Trail (measured during 2012 - 2013),
  Updated (2012-2013) table of elevations at mileposts and landmarks along the W&OD Trail
 
 
  Maps and descriptions of entire W&OD Trail and trail segments, showing connecting trails.

Rail trails in Virginia
Regional parks in Virginia
NOVA Parks
Long-distance trails in the United States
National Recreation Trails in Virginia
Parks in Arlington County, Virginia
Parks in Fairfax County, Virginia
Parks in Loudoun County, Virginia
Falls Church, Virginia
Bike paths in Virginia
Geography of Alexandria, Virginia
Transportation in Arlington County, Virginia
Transportation in Loudoun County, Virginia
Transportation in Fairfax County, Virginia
Leesburg, Virginia
Vienna, Virginia